The Innocents: A Story for Lovers is a 1917 novel by Sinclair Lewis.

Plot

Reception

External links
 
   
 Digitized copies of The Innocents at Internet Archive

1917 American novels
Novels by Sinclair Lewis
Harper & Brothers books